Orla Prendergast (born 1 June 2002) is an Irish cricketer who plays for Dragons and Ireland. In August 2019, she was named in the Irish Women's Twenty20 International (WT20I) squad for the 2019 Netherlands Women's Quadrangular Series. She made her WT20I debut for Ireland, against the Netherlands, on 8 August 2019.

In August 2019, she was named in Ireland's squad for the 2019 ICC Women's World Twenty20 Qualifier tournament in Scotland.

She also played for the Republic of Ireland women's national under-17 football team in 2018 and 2019, and at club level for Cabinteely F.C. She attends The High School, Dublin. In July 2020, she was awarded a non-retainer contract by Cricket Ireland for the following year.

In September 2021, Prendergast was named in Ireland's Women's One Day International (WODI) squad for their series against Zimbabwe, the first WODI matches to be played by the Zimbabwe team. She made her WODI debut on 5 October 2021, for Ireland against Zimbabwe.

In November 2021, she was named in Ireland's team for the 2021 Women's Cricket World Cup Qualifier tournament in Zimbabwe.

References

External links
 
 

2002 births
Living people
Place of birth missing (living people)
Irish women cricketers
Ireland women One Day International cricketers
Ireland women Twenty20 International cricketers
Scorchers (women's cricket) cricketers
Typhoons (women's cricket) cricketers
Dragons (women's cricket) cricketers